The Belgian Fourth Division A was one of the four leagues at the fourth level of the Belgian football league system, the others being the Belgian Fourth Division B, C and D.  This division existed from the 1952-53 to 2015-16 seasons and was played every year with 16 clubs in each league. The league was replaced by Belgian Second Amateur Division.

The final clubs

 — S.V.V. Damme admitted to fill vacancy after R.A.E.C. Mons' bankruptcy on winning repêchage play-offs.

See also
Belgian Third Division
Belgian Fourth Division
Belgian Provincial leagues
Belgian football league system

References

A